Events in the year 2014 in Slovakia.

Incumbents
President: Ivan Gašparovič (until 15 June), Andrej Kiska (starting 15 June)
Prime Minister: Robert Fico

Events
 March 15 - the first round of the Slovak presidential election is held. Prime Minister Robert Fico and businessman-turned philanthropist Andrej Kiska advance to the second round.
 March 29 – Philanthropist Andrej Kiska wins Slovakia's presidential run-off against current Prime Minister Robert Fico.

Births

Deaths

Vladimír Krajňák, 86, Slovak Olympic skier.
Ján Hirka, 90, Slovak Catholic hierarch, Bishop of Prešov (1990–2002).
Ľudovít Lehen, 88, Slovakian painter and chess composer.
Miroslav Hlinka, 42, Slovak ice hockey player, gold medalist at the 2002 IIHF World Championship, suicide by hanging.
Vladimír Hrivnák, 69, Slovak football player and manager.

References

 
2010s in Slovakia
Years of the 21st century in Slovakia
Slovakia
Slovakia